Mohamed Aoudou Golanne (born 30 November 1989) is a Beninese professional footballer who plays as a forward. Between 2009 and 2016 he made 16 appearances scoring 2 goals for the Benin national team.

Career
Born in Aplahoué, Aoudou has played club football for Mambas Noirs, Istra 1961, Évian TG, Tonnerre d'Abomey, COD Meknès, JS Saoura, CR Belouizdad, Free State Stars and Al-Shorta. He scored two goals for Al-Shorta in the 2016–17 Iraqi Premier League.

He made his international debut for Benin in 2009, and has appeared in FIFA World Cup qualifying matches.

References

1989 births
Living people
People from Kouffo Department
Beninese footballers
Mambas Noirs FC players
NK Istra 1961 players
Thonon Evian Grand Genève F.C. players
Tonnerre d'Abomey FC players
COD Meknès players
JS Saoura players
CR Belouizdad players
Free State Stars F.C. players
Al-Shorta SC players
Al-Nahda Club (Saudi Arabia) players
Mosta F.C. players
Benin Premier League players
Croatian Football League players
Championnat National players
Botola players
Algerian Ligue Professionnelle 1 players
Saudi First Division League players
Maltese Premier League players
Association football forwards
Benin international footballers
2010 Africa Cup of Nations players
Beninese expatriate footballers
Expatriate footballers in Croatia
Beninese expatriate sportspeople in Croatia
Expatriate footballers in France
Beninese expatriate sportspeople in France
Expatriate footballers in Morocco
Beninese expatriate sportspeople in Morocco
Expatriate footballers in Algeria
Beninese expatriate sportspeople in Algeria
Expatriate soccer players in South Africa
Beninese expatriate sportspeople in South Africa
Expatriate footballers in Iraq
Beninese expatriate sportspeople in Iraq
Expatriate footballers in Saudi Arabia
Expatriate footballers in Malta